All the Wars is a studio album by the British alternative rock band the Pineapple Thief, released in 2012.

Production
A choir and a 22-piece string section appear on the album.

Critical reception
Record Collector wrote that frontman Brice Soord's songs "aren’t mere entertainments; they’re demanding pieces, both muscular and intricate, concerned with conflicts and dislocation, charting personal battles drawn out on large canvases." The Bristol Post deemed the album "hugely impressive."

Track listing

Personnel
Bruce Soord: vocals, guitar, composer
Steve Kitch: keyboards, mixing
Jon Sykes: bass guitar, vocals
Keith Harrison: drums, vocals

Production
Arranged by The Pineapple Thief
Written by Bruce Soord
Recorded by Mark Bowyer
Mixed (& Additional Production) by Mark Bowyer and Steve Kitch

References

External links
The Pineapple Thief's official website
All the Wars microsite

2012 albums
The Pineapple Thief albums
Kscope albums